The 1964–65 Inter-Cities Fairs Cup was the seventh Inter-Cities Fairs Cup. The competition was won by Ferencváros, who beat Juventus in the final at the Italians' home ground, the Stadio Comunale in Turin. It was only the second time that a Spanish side had not won the competition, and the first of two occasions it went to Eastern Europe.

First round

First leg

Second leg

Juventus won 2–0 on aggregate.

Petrolul Ploiești won 3–1 on aggregate.

Basel won 2–1 on aggregate.

Strasbourg won 2–1 on aggregate.

Barcelona won 2–1 on aggregate.

Aggregate 1–1.

Manchester United won 7–2 on aggregate.

Roma won 3–0 on aggregate.

Ferencváros won 2–1 on aggregate.

Play-off

Shelbourne won 3-2 on aggregate.

Second round

First leg

The NK ZagrebRoma match came close to being cancelled due to the 1964 Zagreb flood. Proceeds from the ticket sales were donated toward the flood recovery efforts.

Second leg

Juventus won 1–0 on aggregate.

Lokomotiv Plovdiv won 2–1 on aggregate.

Strasbourg won 6–2 on aggregate.

Manchester United won 10–1 on aggregate.

Roma won 2–1 on aggregate.

Atlético won 2–0 on aggregate.

Third round

First leg

Second leg

Lokomotiv Plovdiv 2–2 Juventus on aggregate.

Strasbourg won on coin toss.

Juventus won 2–1 in play-off.

Manchester United won 3–2 on aggregate.

Ferencváros won 3–1 on aggregate.

Quarter-finals

First leg

Second leg

Manchester United won 5–0 on aggregate.

Semi-finals

First leg

Second leg

Juventus 4–4 Atlético Madrid on aggregate.

Juventus won 3–1 in play-off.

Ferencváros 3–3 Manchester United on aggregate.

Ferencváros won 2–1 in play-off.

Final

References
{

External links
 Inter-Cities Fairs Cup results at Rec.Sport.Soccer Statistics Foundation

2
Inter-Cities Fairs Cup seasons